Sihotra is a village, Union Council, and administrative subdivision of Jhelum District (Urdu جہلم) in the Punjab Province of Pakistan. It is part of Pind Dadan Khan Tehsil.

References 

Villages in Union Council Golepur
Villages in Pind Dadan Khan Tehsil